Anastrangalia rubriola kashmirica is a species of beetle from family Cerambycidae.

References

Lepturinae